Government and Opposition is a quarterly peer-reviewed academic journal on politics. It was published by Wiley-Blackwell until 2013, when it switched to Cambridge University Press. The journal was established in 1965 and the editors-in-chief are Laura Cram (University of Edinburgh) and Erik Jones (Johns Hopkins University). According to the Journal Citation Reports, the journal has a 2018 impact factor of 2.582, ranking it 32nd out of 176 journals in the category "Political Science".

References

External links
 

Cambridge University Press academic journals
English-language journals
Political science journals
Quarterly journals
Publications established in 1965